Herdi Noor Al-Din (born January 24, 1992, in Kirkuk, Iraq) is an Iraqi football player of Kurdish ethnicity, who currently plays for Kirkuk FC in Iraq. He was called to the Iraq Youth team by Kadhim Al-Rubaiawy but later was Released by Hakim Shakir.

Info
The Kirkuk-born midfielder was a revelation for his hometown club before a tug of war between Pires and Arbil late last year saw him move to the Iraqi league champions Arbil FC, despite having signed a deal to play for Peris FC. He was called for the national team under Radhi Shenaishil to play a friendly match against Saudi Arabia. A top prospect for the future.

2010-2011
The midfielder has stated he plans on attending a high school in Minnesota to play soccer and learn English, Al-Din is said to be part of an exchange program post-Sadaam era with the United States aimed at educating kids about diversity and understanding.  2 other players are to join him, but have not been formally announced.

External links

People from Kirkuk
Iraqi footballers
Iraq international footballers
1992 births
Living people
Association football midfielders